Rosa Isabel Mutya Buena (born 21 May 1985) is an English singer and songwriter who rose to fame as a member of girl group the Sugababes. With the Sugababes, Buena had four UK number one singles, an additional six top-ten hits and three multi-platinum albums. After leaving the group in December 2005, she released her debut solo album, Real Girl in June 2007. Buena returned to Sugababes with the original lineup in 2012.

In 2012, Buena and her former Sugababes bandmates Siobhán Donaghy and Keisha Buchanan confirmed their reunion. The original trio originally opted to release music under the name MKS (Mutya Keisha Siobhan), releasing one single, "Flatline", in 2013. In September 2019, the group officially confirmed their return as the Sugababes. In May 2021, Mutya released a UK garage-inspired track entitled "The One" with electronic music producer duo Ryuken on New State Music.

Early life 
Buena was born in Kingsbury, London and attended Kingsbury High School. Her father is Filipino with partial Spanish descent and her mother is of English and Irish descent.

Career

1998–2005: Early career and Sugababes 

The Sugababes were formed in 1998 by Siobhán Donaghy, Keisha Buchanan and Buena. Their debut album, One Touch, was released in November 2000 and peaked at number twenty-six on the UK Albums Chart, eventually earning a gold certification. One Touch spawned four singles, three of which reached the top twenty, while the album's lead single "Overload" was nominated for a BRIT Award for "Best British Single". The album's sales did not meet the expectations of London Records and the group was subsequently dropped. The group's second album Angels with Dirty Faces was released in August 2002 through Island Records. Influenced by the new wave, dance, and pop music of the 1980s, the record enjoyed success in the UK, where it reached number two and went triple platinum. It produced two number one singles and was nominated for "Best British Album" at the 2003 BRIT Awards.

Three, Sugababes' third album, was released in October 2003. It reached number three in the UK and produced four singles, all of which reached the top ten. The group's fourth album, Taller in More Ways, was released in October 2005. The album reached number one and went double platinum in the UK. On 21 December 2005, it was announced Buena left the Sugababes. According to an announcement on their official website, "[Buena]'s decision was based purely on personal reasons and she will continue to remain the best of friends with both [Buchanan] and [Range]". Buena later stated in an interview that she was suffering from postnatal depression after the birth of her daughter combined with the group's increasingly hectic schedules, and chose to leave to spend more time with her daughter. The last remaining original member, Buchanan, said upon Buena's departure, "...we will all miss Mutya, but we also knew there was still a place for bringing in somebody new who could help us carry on taking the Sugababes brand of music forward". Amelle Berrabah joined the group 48 hours after Buena's departure.

2006–2011: Real Girl, other ventures and musical hiatus 
Following her departure from the Sugababes, Buena began working on her debut album in early 2006 after signing with her previous label, Universal Island Records. She also contributed vocals to the album Soundboy Rock by Groove Armada. The first single to be released in the UK featuring Buena was a ballad duet with George Michael, titled "This Is Not Real Love". It was released in November 2006 and reached number 15 in the UK. Preceding the album, the title track, "Real Girl", was released in early 2007. It reached number 2 in the UK and received a BRIT Award nomination for "Best Single". The song samples Lenny Kravitz's hit "It Ain't Over 'Til It's Over", and was produced by London-based production company Full Phat. "Real Girl" was also featured on the Sex and the City, Vol 2: More Music Soundtrack. Buena's debut album, Real Girl, peaked at number 10 on the UK Albums Chart. "Song 4 Mutya (Out of Control)", her collaboration with dance duo Groove Armada, was released in the UK in July 2007 peaked at number 8. The fourth release from the album was "Just a Little Bit", which reached number 65. Buena also collaborated with Amy Winehouse, on a re-working of the track "Be My Baby" by The Ronettes titled "B Boy Baby", which reached number 73 in the UK top 75. On 1 October 2007, Buena was nominated for the 2007 British "Music of Black Origin" (MOBO) awards at the O2 Arena in London.

On 12 February 2008, Buena was dropped by her record label due to poor sales and charting positions from Real Girl and her last two singles, "Just a Little Bit" and "B Boy Baby".

In October 2008, Buena appeared on Alan Carr's Celebrity Ding Dong. In January 2009, Buena featured on Asher D's second single "With You", from his album Ashley Walters, as well as the Don-E track "The Time Is Now". She also promoted the collaborations "Fallin'" with Agent X and "Give Back" with Tah Mac. Buena also joined an array of UK, US and Jamaican artists to feature on the debut single of the London-based urban/funky house production duo, NightShift. The song is titled "Can You Persuade Me" and it also features MegaMan (So Solid Crew), DJ Ironik, Sisqó, Tanto Metro & Devonte, TQ, Steelo, Juxci D, J2K, Wretch 32, Sam Obernik and Mr. Vegas. After rejection from Buena, the song was then recorded by Pitbull as "I Know You Want Me (Calle Ocho)".

On 2 January 2009, Buena entered Celebrity Big Brother 6 as a housemate. On 16 January 2009, day 15 of the series, she walked out of the Big Brother house after surviving eviction the same night. She was the last celebrity housemate to walk from the show until Claire King left the Summer 2014 series of Celebrity Big Brother on 31 August 2014.

In September 2010, Buena contributed to six tracks on the album The Sound of Camden, which was recorded in Israel with music producer Roy Sela. The album deals with Camden Town market in London, and has been available for purchase at the market itself and online. She recorded a series of covers of rock songs from rock bands such as U2, The Pixies and Iron Maiden, in a chilled-out-lounge style. In October 2010, Buena expressed uncertainty about continuing in the music industry and said she was currently training to become a psychologist for children. Despite the announcement, Buena teamed up with City Boy Soul, a band consisting of ex-Damage singer Coree Richards and British rapper Gak Jonze, and digitally released "Be Ok" in January 2011. Buena also recorded lead vocals for "Give Me Love", penned by UK DJ/Producer Paul Morrell. Mutya was set to release "My Love" featuring Thor Alaye in early 2012 and "Bedroom" featuring Shide Boss during the same year. Buena performed at Birmingham Gay Pride on 28 May 2011. In 2011, Buena released a demo on SoundCloud called "All B4".

2011–2017: Forming Mutya Keisha Siobhan 

In October 2011, several news outlets reported that the original line-up of the Sugababes would reform. In January 2012, further circulations that the group would reunite were sparked, after both Buena and Buchanan tweeted that they were in the studio with "two other females" and British rapper Professor Green. However, Buena later denied this on Twitter, saying: "No track [with] keisha or professor G he was around tha studio. im jus workin on my stuff @ tha moment. (sic)" Despite this, Scottish singer-songwriter Emeli Sandé confirmed to MTV UK that she had written new songs for Buena, Buchanan and Donaghy, saying: "Yes, that is true. I've written for the original line-up of the Sugababes, which I'm very happy about because I just loved them when they first came out. I loved their sound, it was so cool. It was very different, so I'm happy to kind of be involved in what started the whole Sugababes journey. It sounds amazing." In April 2012, it was reported that the line-up had signed a £1 million record deal with Polydor Records. In June 2012, Donaghy confirmed on Twitter that new music would be released, saying: "the soonest it'll be is in 2 weeks. The latest is 10 weeks."

In July 2012, it was officially confirmed that the group had reformed under the name Mutya Keisha Siobhan and were writing songs for a new album under Polydor.

2017–present: Solo projects and return to Sugababes 

In March 2017, Buena started her own agency with friends. The agency is called Colour of Musiq.

In 2018, Buena was featured on the track called "Game Over" with Rockwell, JSTN and Rico Flames. She was also featured in the music video. Buena has also began undertaking various television projects. She appeared in an episode of MTV's Just Tattoo of Us, and appeared in series 5 of Celebs Go Dating on E4.

In 2019, she appeared on the fourth series of Celebrity Coach Trip alongside Lisa Maffia. The couple won the series.

In September 2019 Buena regained rights to the Sugababes name and rejoined the band alongside original members Keisha Buchanan and Siobhan Donaghy. They featured on a track on a DJ Spoony album and confirmed that they had plans to release new material and tour in 2020. The plans were later put on hold, due to the COVID-19 pandemic. In 2019, she was ranked as #2 among the best girl band members of all time in a Guardian article, second only to American singer Beyoncé.

In February 2020, she released the single "Black Valentine", on which she has writing credit, in collaboration with London-based pop duo Electric Pineapple. Later that year, she expressed an interest in releasing an R&B album.

In February 2022, Buena released the single "Feels Good" alongside Ryuken. On 20 May 2022, Buena released the single "Takin' It Easy| alongside Morfius.

In 2022, Buena as part of Sugababes appeared at various festivals, embarked on a headline tour and released The Lost Tapes, an album consisting of their 2013 single "Flatline" and previously unreleased material.

Personal life 

On 23 March 2005, Buena gave birth to her daughter Tahlia. Buena dedicated a song to her late sister Maya on the Sugababes album, Three.

In March 2010, Buena filed a claim for ownership of the Sugababes name with the European Trademark Authority. Though Buchanan and Donaghy's names appear on the trademark submission, it was confirmed that Buena was the sole applicant for submission and Donaghy and Buchanan were not involved. The fourth line-up launched an opposition to the claim on the basis that goodwill and reputation in the mark and trading name "Sugababes" belongs to the partnership – not an individual.

Buena has buttock implants and previously had breast enlargements. In November 2013, Buena had the implants removed.

In September 2014, Buena was declared to be bankrupt by a High Court judge. In 2020, she criticised the media for not covering the fact that she instantly paid off her £100,000 tax debts when she was made aware of the administrative error made by her accountants.

Discography 

Real Girl (2007)

Awards and nominations 
{| class="wikitable sortable plainrowheaders"
|-
! scope="col" | Award
! scope="col" | Year
! scope="col" | Category
! scope="col" | Nominee(s)
! scope="col" | Result
! scope="col" class="unsortable"| 
|-
! scope="row"|Antville Music Video Awards
| 2007
| Worst Video
| "Song 4 Mutya (Out of Control)"
| 
|
|-
! scope="row"|BMI London Awards
| 2005
| Pop Award
| "Hole in the Head"
| 
|
|-
! scope="row" rowspan=7|Brit Awards
| 2001
| British Single of the Year
| "Overload"
| 
|
|-
| rowspan=3|2003
| British Group
| rowspan=2|Sugababes
| 
|rowspan=3|
|-
| British Dance Act
| 
|-
| British Album of the Year
| Angels with Dirty Faces
| 
|-
| 2004
| British Group
| Sugababes
| 
| 
|-
| 2005
| rowspan=2|British Single of the Year
| "In the Middle"
| 
|
|-
| 2008
| "Real Girl"
| 
|
|-
! scope="row" rowspan=2|Capital FM's Awards
| 2001
| Best Kept Secret
| rowspan=2|Sugababes
| 
|
|-
| 2004
| Best Live Music
| 
|
|-
! scope="row" |Disney Channel Kids Awards
| 2004
| Best Single
| "Hole in the Head"
| 
| 
|-
! scope="row" |Elle Style Awards
| 2002
| Music Star Award
| Sugababes
| 
|
|-
! scope="row" |Ivor Novello Awards
| 2004
| Most Performed Work
| "Hole in the Head"
| 
|
|-
! scope="row" rowspan=3|MOBO Awards
| 2002
| rowspan=2|Best UK Act
| rowspan=2|Sugababes
| 
|
|-
|2003
| 
|
|-
| 2007
| Best UK Newcomer
| Herself
| 
|
|-
! scope="row" |MTV Europe Music Awards
| 2002
| Best UK & Ireland Act
| rowspan=3|Sugababes
| 
|
|-
! scope="row" |NME Awards
| 2001
| Best R&B/Soul Act
| 
|
|-
! scope="row"|Pop Factory Awards
| 2002
| Best Pop Act
| 
| 
|-
! scope="row" rowspan=3|Popjustice £20 Music Prize
| 2004
| rowspan=3|Best British Pop Single
| "Hole in the Head"
| 
|rowspan=3|
|-
| 2008
| "Song 4 Mutya (Out of Control)"
| 
|-
| 2013
| "Flatline"
| 
|-
! scope="row"|Q Awards
| 2002
| Best Track
| "Freak Like Me"
| 
|
|-
! scope="row" rowspan=9| Smash Hits Poll Winners Party
| 2000
| Best New Band
| rowspan=3|Sugababes
| 
|
|-
| rowspan=4|2002
| Best Band on Planet Pop
| 
|rowspan=3|
|-
| Best UK Band
| 
|-
| Best Single
| "Round Round"
| 
|-
| rowspan=2|Best Album
| Angels with Dirty Faces
| 
| 
|-
| rowspan=4|2005
| Taller in More Ways
| 
|rowspan=3|
|-
| Best Single
| rowspan=2|"Push the Button"
| 
|-
| Best Video
| 
|-
| Best UK Band
| rowspan=2|Sugababes
| 
|
|-
! scope="row" rowspan=2|TOFP Awards
| 2002
| Best Pop Act
| 
|
|-
| 2005
| Best Single
| "Push the Button"
| 
|

References 

 
1985 births
Living people
English women singer-songwriters
English child singers
Filipino British musicians
English mezzo-sopranos
Sugababes members
English people of Filipino descent
English people of Irish descent
Singers from London
People from Kingsbury, London
English women pop singers
21st-century British women singers